The 2015 Meiji Yasuda J1 League (2015 明治安田生命J1リーグ) season was the 50th season of top-flight football in Japan, and the 23rd since the establishment of the J.League in 1993.

For a five-year period starting in 2015, the J.League changed to a newly conceived multistage system, with the year split into two halves and a third and final championship stage. The winners of the first and second stages and the highest ranking club of the aggregate table (other than the first or second stage winners) will qualify for the Championship Stage. Sanfrecce Hiroshima won the Championship Stage and advanced to the 2015 FIFA Club World Cup as the host nation's entrant.

Clubs

Managerial changes

Foreign players

Format changes
Teams play a single round-robin in the first stage and a single round-robin in the second stage. After that an overall table is calculated and a championship stage is played. The winners of the first and second stages and any team that finishes in the top 3 of the overall rankings advance to the championship stage. The team that finishes atop the overall table automatically qualifies for the final, while the remaining teams play-off for the other spot in the final.

League table

First stage

Second stage

Overall table

Positions by round

First stage

Second stage

Overall

Championship stage
Meiji Yasuda 2015 J.League Championship (明治安田生命 2015 Jリーグチャンピオンシップ)
The Championship stage consisted of a knockout tournament involving the champions of the First and Second Stages, and any team that finishes in the top 3 of the overall table. The team with the best aggregate record earned a bye to the final. The remaining teams playoff for the other spot in the final.

Results

First stage

Second stage

Top scorers

Updated to games played on 22 November 2015

Source: J.League Data

Awards

Individual

Best Eleven

* The number in brackets denotes the number of times that the footballer has appeared in the Best 11.

Attendances

References

J1 League seasons
1
Japan
Japan